Rising Student's Club  is an Indian professional multisports club based in Cuttack, Odisha, India. The club plays in the FAO League, the fourth tier of Indian football and top tier of Odisha state football. It played in the Indian Women's League, the top tier of Indian women's football, and currently participates in the Odisha Women's League. Rising Student's Club were the champions of the Indian Women's League in the 2017–18 season.

Women's team records

Seasons

2019 squad

Honours

Men's
FAO League
Runners-up (3): 2010, 2015, 2019

FAO Super Cup
Runners-up (1): 2018

Women's
Indian Women's League
Champions (1): 2017–18
Runners-up (1): 2016–17
FAO Women's League
Champions (3): 2013, 2017, 2020–21

References

External links
 Rising Student's Club at Soccerway
 Team profile at AIFF website

Football clubs in Odisha
Association football clubs established in 2016
2016 establishments in Odisha
Women's football clubs in India
Indian Women's League clubs
Sports clubs in India
Multi-sport clubs in India